Comix 2000 was an international one-shot independent comic book published in 1999 by L'Association (France) and distributed in the United States by Fantagraphics Books.

All the comics featured in Comix 2000 are wordless in order to accommodate readers of any nationality. Notable contributors to Comix 2000 include Jessica Abel, Edmond Baudoin, Nick Bertozzi, Stéphane Blanquet, Émile Bravo, David B., Mike Diana, Julie Doucet, Renée French, Tom Hart, Dylan Horrocks, Megan Kelso, Patrice Killoffer, James Kochalka, Étienne Lécroart, Jean-Christophe Menu, Brian Ralph, Ron Regé, Jr., Joann Sfar, R. Sikoryak, Lewis Trondheim, Chris Ware, Skip Williamson, and Aleksandar Zograf.

The book's layout resembles that of a dictionary, with 2000 pages of comics depicting the work of 324 authors from 29 different countries, plus an introduction—in ten different languages—and a bibliography for each contributor.

Contributors 

Comics anthologies
1999 graphic novels
Pantomime comics